Nuvrei (also known as Nuvrei Bakery, Nuvrei Patisserie and Cafe, and Nuvrei Pastries) is a bakery in Portland, Oregon.

Description and history 

Nuvrei is a pâtisserie in northwest Portland's Pearl District. The menu has included macarons, pretzel croissants, and sandwiches.

The business is owned by Marius Pop. In 2010, Nuvrei announced plans to open an upstairs cafe. The cafe opened in October 2011. Paul Losch was announced as chef in 2012. In early 2014, Nuvrei announced plans to open Macaron Bar (or "Mac Bar") downstairs. The upstairs cafe closed temporarily for renovations in January 2015; during this time seating was expanded in the downstairs Brioche Week and the business launched Brioche Week to offer additional pastries. In May, Nuvrei reopened with a new aesthetic and a "totally revamped menu with a new, much more intense emphasis on pastries".

Heart Coffee Roasters began serving Nuvrei pastries in 2015. Nuvrei expanded with a second location in 2016; no seating was offered when the new concept Pop Bagel opened in the lobby of the U.S Bancorp Tower.

Reception 

Kara Stokes and Michelle Lopez included Nuvrei's walnut cookie in Eater Portland's 2019 list of "Portland's Most Unforgettable Cookies". In her 2020 overview of "Worthy Portland Restaurants and Bars Super Close to Trimet Stations", the website's Brooke Jackson-Glidden wrote, "This pristine, charming bakery is the place to be for artful, crispy croissants of countless flavors, pretty little macarons, and one hell of a chewy walnut cookie." She also included Nuvrei in an overview of "Where to Get Breakfast and Brunch for Delivery or Takeout in Portland", published in 2020 during the COVID-19 pandemic. In 2021, the website's Michelle Lopez included the bakery in a list of "Where to Find Flaky, Crackly Croissants in Portland", and she and Jackson-Glidden included Nuvrei in a list of "Outstanding Bakeries in Portland and Beyond". Kara Stokes and Maya MacEvoy included Nuvrei in a 2022 list of "Where to Eat and Drink in Portland's Pearl District".

See also 

 List of bakeries

References

External links 

 
 Nuvrei Patisserie & Café at Zomato

Bakeries of Oregon
Pâtisserie
Pearl District, Portland, Oregon
Restaurants in Portland, Oregon